Miguel Ángel Muñoz Blanco (born 4 July 1983) is a Spanish actor and singer.

Career
Muñoz began his career as an actor at the age of eleven in the film El Palomo cojo (1995), followed by many television appearances. From 1997-98, he was a regular on the soap opera Al salir de clase, played a recurring character from 2000-02 on the series Compañeros, and dubbed the voice of Sinbad in the Spanish version of the 2003 American animated adventure film Sinbad: Legend of the Seven Seas.

From 2002-04, Muñoz starred as Roberto Arenales on the television series Un Paso Adelante, for which he took dance classes. The series, much like the American show Fame, was set in a performing arts school. It became an international hit and proved to be the breakout role for Muñoz. Muñoz joined several of his castmates to form the band  Upa Dance, including: Beatriz Luengo, Pablo Puyol, Monica Cruz, Silvia Marty, Edu Del Prado and Elizabeth Jordan. The group released four albums, from 2002 to 2005, all scoring in the top 5 on the charts in Spain (two at #1), with one also reaching #1 on the charts in France.

In 2004, Muñoz released the single "Dirás que estoy loco", a song he had performed on the series. The song was ranked #1 in Spain for eleven consecutive weeks, selling 180,000 copies. In 2006, Muñoz released his first solo album, M.A.M., which was certified Gold in Italy and Silver in France. The album included "Dirás que estoy loco", which was released as a single across Europe, reaching #2 on the charts in Italy and peaking at #3 in France. In 2008, Muñoz won a European Border Breakers Award Award for M.A.M..

Along with his success as a recording artist, Muñoz continued acting, performing steadily in television and on film, as well as appearing on stage in El Cartero Neruda in 2006. He also joined the series Mis Adorables Vecinos in 2006. Muñoz appeared in the film The Borgia (2006) and the horror film Intrusos en Manasés (2008). From 2007-08, Muñoz acted in the title role of Úlises in the series El síndrome de Úlises.

In 2010, Muñoz played his first high-profile English-speaking role as Antegua in the miniseries Ben Hur. In 2011, he was Toti Blanco in the series Vida loca. The following year, he joined the third season of Capadocia, playing the character Hector Bolaños.

In late 2014 Muñoz made it to fourth place as a contestant on the fifth season of the series Danse avec les Stars, in France. He finished in fourth place with his partner, Fauve Hautot.

Personal life
From 2018 to 2020, Muñoz was in relationship with Ana Guerra.

Filmography

Stage credits

Discography

Studio albums with UPA Dance

Solo studio albums

Solo singles

Master Chef Celebrity
In 2016 Muñoz won the first Master Chef Celebrity of Spain. He chose charity Fundación Pequeño Deseo as the recipient of his €75,000 prize.

References

External links 
 Official Website
 

1983 births
Living people
Male actors from Madrid
Singers from Madrid
Spanish male dancers
Spanish male film actors
Spanish male models
Spanish male stage actors
Spanish male television actors
21st-century Spanish male actors
Spanish male child actors
Participants in French reality television series
21st-century Spanish singers
21st-century Spanish male singers